Lesparre-Médoc, commonly known as Lesparre, is a commune in the Gironde department, Nouvelle-Aquitaine, southwestern France. It is a sub-prefecture of the department.

Geography
Lesparre is on the Médoc peninsula about 80 km north of Bordeaux.

History
Traces of human occupation from the Neolithic era have been discovered in the town. Before the arrival of the Romans, the area was inhabited by the Biturges, a Celtic tribe. After the Roman Empire collapsed, various peoples such as the Arabs and Normans came into the area. During the rule of Charlemagne, a castle was built to protect the town from further invasions. In the High Middle Ages it was the site of castle. The troubadour Aimeric de Belenoi was born here. In 1790, the town was promoted to district capital. During WWII, the town was the site of guerilla warfare with German troops. During the 20th century, the infrastructure of the town was expanded and the population grew to 5,200 people.

Population

International relations
Lesparre is twinned with Drayton in the Vale of White Horse, Oxfordshire, England.

Notable persons
Bour de Lesparre, Mercenary captain of the Hundred Years' War

See also
Communes of the Gironde department

References

Communes of Gironde
Gironde communes articles needing translation from French Wikipedia
Subprefectures in France
Guyenne